The Final Four Volleyball Cup is a Bi-Continental Cup organized by the Pan-American Volleyball Union from 2008 to 2011, with the top two ranked teams from the NORCECA and CSV confederations at the Men's and Women's Pan-American Cup.

The women's competition run from 2008 to 2010, but has been dropped out of the NORCECA and PVU Calendar as of 2011. FIVB, however, has the competitions programmed until 2013.

History

Men

Women

See also
Men's Pan-American Volleyball Cup
Women's Pan-American Volleyball Cup

References

International women's volleyball competitions
Recurring sporting events established in 2008
Recurring sporting events established in 2013